MasterChef Australia is a television cooking competition that is typically broadcast for three months each year since 2009. There are generally 24 contestants each year.

A number of those contestants, who were untrained home cooks at the time of their appearance, have gone on to host their own television cooking series.

References

MasterChef Australia
Australian cooking television series